The Basilan flying squirrel (Philippines flying squirrel or Mindanao flying squirrel) (Petinomys crinitus) is a species of rodent in the family Sciuridae. It is endemic to the Philippines. It is often confused with mindanao flying squirrel (Petinomys mindanensis)

References

Thorington, R. W. Jr. and R. S. Hoffman. 2005. Family Sciuridae. pp. 754–818 in Mammal Species of the World a Taxonomic and Geographic Reference. D. E. Wilson and D. M. Reeder eds. Johns Hopkins University Press, Baltimore.

Petinomys
Rodents of the Philippines
Mammals described in 1911
Endemic fauna of the Philippines
Fauna of Basilan
Taxonomy articles created by Polbot